Mersin Büyükşehir Belediyesi S.K. Women's Basketball is the women basketball section of Mersin Büyükşehir Belediyesi S.K., a major sports club in Mersin, Turkey.

The team plays their home games at the 1,750-seating capacity Edip Buran Arena. 
After 2013 Mediterranean Games, they played their matches in Servet Tazegül Arena (capacity : 7,500).

Achievements
Turkish Women's Basketball League:
Runners-up (1): 2008-09
President Cup:
Winners (1): 2008-09

Roster

References

External links
Official website 
Eurobasket.com Page
Facebook Page
Twitter Page
Instagram Page

Women's basketball teams in Turkey
 
Sport in Mersin
Basketball teams established in 1993

tr:Mersin Büyükşehir Belediyesi Spor Kulübü